Piz di Pian is a mountain of the Lepontine Alps on the Swiss-Italian border. With an elevation of 3,158 m (10,361 ft), it is the highest summit on the chain south of Pizzo Tambo.

References

External links
 Piz di Pian on Hikr

Pian
Pian
Pian
Pian
Italy–Switzerland border
International mountains of Europe
Mountains of Graubünden
Lepontine Alps